Joy and the Dragon is a surviving 1916 silent film directed by Henry King and starring himself and 'Baby' Marie Osborne. It was produced at the Balboa Amusement Producing Company and distributed by the Pathé Exchange.

Copies survive in London (BFI) and Valencia Spain (Instituto Valenciano De Cinematografia).

Cast
'Baby' Marie Osborne - Joy
Henry King - Hal Lewis
Mollie McConnell - The Matron
Cullen Landis - Slinky Joe (*L. Cullen Landis)

Synopsis 
From the Descriptive Catalogue of Pathéscope Films: On the blue waves floats the remainder of a wrecked ship. On the wreck is little Mary who is now an orphan, both her parents having been drowned when the ship went down. Mary is taken to an orphan asylum; there she has all sorts of troubles and runs away. While everybody thinks she was drowned, she simply is on a locomotive, heading West. She finds herself in a Western small town grocery store, at the time a man draws a revolver to shoot another; she disarms the assailant. The attacked man happens to be James Lewis, the son of a rich Easterner; he came West after reverses and gambling adventures, to reform. Mary's intervention so strongly impressed the stranger that he adopts the child. The would-be assassin, not satisfied to let Lewis escape, plans a new plot to kill him with a bomb. The little girl discovers the bomb and explodes it, again saving her benefactor from certain death. James is so affected by this that he sells the claim and returns to his former life with the idea of making little Mary happy forever.

References

External links

1916 films
Silent American drama films
American silent feature films
Films directed by Henry King
1916 drama films
American black-and-white films
1910s English-language films
1910s American films